Jean-Paul Crespelle (24 December 1910 – 1994) was a journalist and author. He was born in Nogent-sur-Marne, Île-de-France, France.

Crespelle wrote important historical works on the artistic and nocturnal life of the artists who gathered in Montmartre and Montparnasse at the turn of the 20th century.

Works
(Partial bibliography)
 A la découverte de l'art dans les musées de Paris (1961)
 The Fauves (1962)
 Montparnasse vivant (1962) – Prix Hercule Catenacci
 Montmartre vivant (1964) – Prix Charles Blanc
 La folle époque: Des ballets russes au surréalisme (1968) – Prix Charles Blanc
 Picasso and his women (1969)
 Modigliani: Les femmes, les amis, l'œuvre (1969)	
 The Love, The Dreams, The Life of Chagall (1969)
 Utrillo: La bohème et l'ivresse à Montmartre (1970)
 Degas et son monde (1972)
 Pablo Picasso (1975)
 La vie quotidienne à Montparnasse à la grande époque 1905-1930 (1976)
 La vie quotidienne des impressionnistes, 1863-1883 (1981)
 La vie quotidienne a Montmartre au temps de Picasso, 1900-1910 (1982)
 Monet : Chefs d'Â uvres (1986)
 La Epoca de Los Impresionistas (1990)

References

Brief biography of Jean-Paul Crespelle 

1910 births
1994 deaths
People from Nogent-sur-Marne
French biographers
20th-century biographers
20th-century French male writers
French male non-fiction writers
20th-century French journalists